Events from the year 1870 in Russia.

Incumbents
 Monarch – Alexander II

Events

 
 
  
  
 Perm Opera and Ballet Theatre
 The Russian Tax Debate of 1870–1871

Births

April 22 - Vladimir Lenin
May 29 - Nikolay Bauman
October 10 - Ivan Bunin
February 17 - Georgy Gapon

Deaths

 May 2 – Grand Duke Alexander Alexandrovich of Russia (b. 1869)

References

1870 in Russia
Years of the 19th century in the Russian Empire